The matching adjustment is a mechanism prescribed in the Solvency II Directive that allows insurance firms 'to adjust the relevant risk-free interest rate term structure for the calculation of a best estimate of a portfolio of eligible insurance obligations'.

Notes

Insurance